A Man's Home is a 1921 American silent drama film directed by Ralph Ince and starring Harry T. Morey, Kathlyn Williams and Faire Binney. It is based on the 1917 Broadway play of the same title by Edmund Breese and Anna Steese Richardson.

Cast
 Harry T. Morey as Frederick Osborn
 Kathlyn Williams aFrances Osborn
 Faire Binney as Lucy Osborn
 Margaret Seddon as Amanda Green
 Grace Valentine as Dordelia Wilson
 Roland Bottomley as 	Jack Wilson
 Matt Moore as 	Arthur Lynn

References

Bibliography
 Connelly, Robert B. The Silents: Silent Feature Films, 1910-36, Volume 40, Issue 2. December Press, 1998.
 Munden, Kenneth White. The American Film Institute Catalog of Motion Pictures Produced in the United States, Part 1. University of California Press, 1997.

External links
 

1921 films
1921 drama films
1920s English-language films
American silent feature films
Silent American drama films
American black-and-white films
Films directed by Ralph Ince
Selznick Pictures films
1920s American films